Irkutskoye Slovo (Irkutsk Word; Иркутское слово) was a Menshevik-oriented weekly newspaper in Russia, published in Irkutsk from 1911 to 1912. Its publisher, Rozhkov, had joined the Russian Social Democratic Labour Party in 1905.

References

Defunct newspapers published in Russia
Defunct weekly newspapers
Russian-language newspapers
Irkutsk
Newspapers established in 1911
Publications disestablished in 1912
1911 establishments in the Russian Empire
1912 disestablishments in the Russian Empire